KMDO (1600 AM) is a radio station broadcasting a classic country format. Licensed to Fort Scott, Kansas, United States, it serves the Pittsburg area. The station is currently owned by Fort Scott Broadcasting Company Inc.

On July 14, 2019, KMDO dropped its simulcast with classic hits-formatted KOMB and launched a classic country format, branded as "Red Dirt Country".

References

External links

MDO
Classic country radio stations in the United States
Bourbon County, Kansas